Troshin is a Russian surname. Notable people with the surname include:

Oleg Troshin (born 1964), Soviet racewalker
Valeriy Troshin (born 1970), Soviet and Russian actor
Vladimir Troshin (1926–2008), Soviet actor and singer
Vyacheslav Troshin (born 22 May 1959), Russian diver

Russian-language surnames